In Greek mythology, Achaeus or Achaios (Ancient Greek: Ἀχαιός Akhaiós means 'griever', derived from αχος achos, 'grief, pain, woe') was, according to nearly all traditions, a son of Xuthus and Creusa, and consequently a brother of Ion and grandson of Hellen. His children were Archander and Architeles.

Mythology
The Achaeans regarded him as the author of their race, and derived from him their own name as well as that of Achaia, which was formerly called Aegialus. When his uncle Aeolus in Thessaly, whence he himself had come to Peloponnesus, died, he went there and made himself master of Phthiotis, which now also received from him the name of Achaia.

Genealogy of Hellenes

Notes

References 

 Apollodorus, The Library with an English Translation by Sir James George Frazer, F.B.A., F.R.S. in 2 Volumes, Cambridge, MA, Harvard University Press; London, William Heinemann Ltd. 1921. ISBN 0-674-99135-4. Online version at the Perseus Digital Library. Greek text available from the same website.
Clement of Alexandria, Recognitions from Ante-Nicene Library Volume 8, translated by Smith, Rev. Thomas. T. & T. Clark, Edinburgh. 1867. Online version at theio.com
Graves, Robert, The Greek Myths: The Complete and Definitive Edition. Penguin Books Limited. 2017.  
Hesiod, Catalogue of Women from Homeric Hymns, Epic Cycle, Homerica translated by Evelyn-White, H G. Loeb Classical Library Volume 57. London: William Heinemann, 1914. Online version at theio.com 
Maurus Servius Honoratus, In Vergilii carmina comentarii. Servii Grammatici qui feruntur in Vergilii carmina commentarii; recensuerunt Georgius Thilo et Hermannus Hagen. Georgius Thilo. Leipzig. B. G. Teubner. 1881. Online version at the Perseus Digital Library.
Pausanias, Description of Greece with an English Translation by W.H.S. Jones, Litt.D., and H.A. Ormerod, M.A., in 4 Volumes. Cambridge, MA, Harvard University Press; London, William Heinemann Ltd. 1918. . Online version at the Perseus Digital Library
Pausanias, Graeciae Descriptio. 3 vols. Leipzig, Teubner. 1903.  Greek text available at the Perseus Digital Library.
Strabo, The Geography of Strabo. Edition by H.L. Jones. Cambridge, Mass.: Harvard University Press; London: William Heinemann, Ltd. 1924. Online version at the Perseus Digital Library.
Strabo, Geographica edited by A. Meineke. Leipzig: Teubner. 1877. Greek text available at the Perseus Digital Library.

Deucalionids
Attican characters in Greek mythology
Mythology of Achaea